The Fresnel–Arago laws are three laws which summarise some of the more important properties of interference between light of different states of polarization. Augustin-Jean Fresnel and François Arago, both discovered the laws, which bear their name.

The laws are as follows:

 Two orthogonal, coherent linearly polarized waves cannot interfere.
 Two parallel coherent linearly polarized waves will interfere in the same way as natural light.
 The two constituent orthogonal linearly polarized states of natural light cannot interfere to form a readily observable interference pattern, even if rotated into alignment (because they are incoherent).

We know that the intensity of light goes as the electric field squared (in fact, where the angled brackets denote a time average), and so we just add the fields before squaring them. Extensive algebra  yields an interference term in the intensity of the resultant wave, namely: 
, where  represents the phase difference arising from a combined path length and initial phase-angle difference.

Finally, if natural light is decomposed into orthogonal linear polarizations (as in the third Fresnel–Arago law), these states are incoherent, meaning that the phase difference  will be fluctuating so quickly and randomly that after time-averaging we have , so again  and there is no interference (even if  is rotated so that it is parallel to ).

See also 
Unpolarized light

References 

Interference
Polarization (waves)